Kinnerasani Wildlife Sanctuary is a forest located in Bhadradri Kothagudem district, Telangana state of India.

Geography
This wildlife sanctuary has a forest mixed with dense scrub and meadows. It comes under the Eastern Highlands moist deciduous forests.

Flora and fauna

Flora:
There is diverse flora and fauna in this sanctuary. Floral diversity is high and includes

Fauna:
There is a varied fauna present in the sanctuary 
The Familiar Mammals in the sanctuary

See also
 Wildlife of India

References

External links

 Kinnerasani wildlife sanctuary from Forest Department of Telangana (India) State

Eastern Highlands moist deciduous forests
Wildlife sanctuaries of Telangana
Protected areas with year of establishment missing
Bhadradri Kothagudem district